Drechterland is a municipality in the Netherlands, in the province of North Holland and the region of West-Frisia. The municipality was formed in 1979, in a merger of the former municipalities of Hoogkarspel, Westwoud and Oosterblokker. Its original name, Bangert, was changed to "Drechterland" in 1980. In 2006, the former municipality of Venhuizen was added to Drechterland.

Population centres 
The municipality of Drechterland consists of the following cities, towns, villages and/or districts:

Topography

Dutch topographic map of the municipality of Drechterland, June 2015

Local government 
The municipal council of Drechterland consists of 17 seats, which are following the 2022 municipal elections as follows:

 SPD - 4 seats
 CDA – 4 seats
 PDL – 3 seats
 VVD – 3 seats 
 GBD – 3 seats

Notable people 

 Jan Jacobszoon May van Schellinkhout (17th c., born in Schellinkhout) a Dutch seafarer and explorer, eponym of Jan Mayen
 Cornelis Jacobsen Mey (17th c., born in Schellinkhout) a Dutch explorer, captain and fur trader
 Wilhelmus Nuyens (1823 in Avenhorn - 1894) a Dutch historian 
 Vincent Mentzel (born 1945 Hoogkarspel) a Dutch newspaper photographer, embraces photorealism

Sport 
 Hendrik Offerhaus (1875 in Venhuizen – 1953) a Dutch rower and bronze medallist in the 1900 Summer Olympics
 Mathieu Boots (born 1975 in Venhuizen) a Dutch retired football player with over 250 club caps
 Thomas Koenis (born 1989 in Hoogkarspel) a Dutch professional basketball player
 Erik Schouten (born 1991 in Westwoud) a Dutch professional footballer with 140 caps with FC Volendam

Gallery

References

External links 

Official website

 
Municipalities of North Holland